Binalonan, officially the Municipality of Binalonan, is a 1st class municipality in the province of Pangasinan, Philippines. According to the 2020 census, it has a population of 56,382 people.

One of Binalonan's natives is the Filipino-American writer Carlos Bulosan, who wrote brief descriptions of the town's history and people in his semi-autobiographical novel entitled America is in the Heart. The town has a memorial and street named after him just north of the municipal hall and town market. It is also the hometown of Evangelina Guico Macaraeg Macapagal, spouse of 9th President Diosdado Macapagal, and mother of 14th President Gloria Macapagal Arroyo.

History

According to historians, the town's name is an evolution of the Pangasinan Language term balon, which means "packed lunch", or in Tagalog, baon.

In a traditional story, which now plays an important role in the town's history, the area was originally owned by a Spaniard named Don Salvador. It was told that he instructed his men to put up crude wooden fences along the property to establish his ownership. During the course of their work, Don Salvador's men used to have their lunch and rest under Camachile trees located in the center of the land mainly due to its breezy shades.

Don Salvador offered his pastureland to several immigrants from Ilocos. When they asked Don Salcador how they were going to find the said land, the owner answered: "It is the place where people bring their balon to eat". Hence the term Binnalonan, which in Ilocano and Pangasinan means "a place where people bring and eat their baon", was born. At present, the town is called Binalonan while its people are known as Binalonians.

Ilocano herdsmen and laborers composed the first town which was founded in 1838, in San Felipe, which was later transferred to Santa Catalina, then returned to the present site.

Geography

Binalonan is located in the eastern part of the province of Pangasinan. The Municipality is bordered on the north by the municipalities of Pozorrubio and Sison, on the south by Urdaneta, on the east by San Manuel and Asingan and on the west by Laoac.

Barangays
Binalonan is subdivided into 24 barangays. These barangays are headed by elected officials: Barangay Captain, Barangay Council, whose members are called Barangay Councilors. All are elected every three years.

Climate

Land classification

Rivers
Binalonan has two major rivers: 
 Aloragat River
 Tagamusing River

It also has minor rivers, including the San Pablo Creek, Tuboy River, Palma Creek, the Camambogan Creek and Balisa Creek.

Soil type
There are five types of soil which can be found in Binalonan:  the San Manuel fine sandy loam, San Manuel loam, San Manuel sandy loam, San Manuel clay, and Umingan sandy loam.

Demographics

The urban population is recorded at 7,634 while the rural population is at 45,088. The urban-rural population ratio is estimated at 15/100. The male-to-female ratio is 1.029.

Economy

Government 
Binalonan, belonging to the fifth congressional district of the province of Pangasinan, is governed by a mayor designated as its local chief executive and by a municipal council as its legislative body in accordance with the Local Government Code. The mayor, vice mayor, and the councilors are elected directly by the people through an election which is being held every three years.

Municipal seal

The topmost structure depicted on the municipal seal is an image of the municipality's Municipal Hall.  Below it on the left is a depiction of the antenna of Digital Communications, the center of communications for Regions I, II and CAR.

Beside the antenna is a representation of a subsidiary source of income in Binalonan: the raising of chickens and hogs. At the bottom, the left image is that of rice stalks, the municipality's main product. Beside it is the picture of a sugar cane, which is the main ingredient for Binalonan's top products — basi, suka and muskuvado (brown sugar). The shield encasing these images means that Binalonan is under the province of Pangasinan.

Elected officials

Tourism
Binalonan Rock Garden defines the town with century-old acacia trees guarding the walking pavements, benches, Balikbayan Hall, basketball court and the pathway towards the historic Santo Niño Parish Church.

The town's interesting points include:
 The Santo Niño Parish Church is the town's landmark and Spanish colonial architectural legacy
 Mount Paldingan Stations of the Cross in Barangay Santa Catalina
 The town has a central transport terminal, a Bagsakan Center (wholesale trade) library and community eCenter
 The New Market Shed and Food Terminal were opened on 27 September 2012
 The Binalonan Airfield and Binalonan airport
 Balon-Balon Festival and Fiesta
 Rupertos Inland Resort
 Balangobong field
 Binalonan Fiesta - vibrant festival with various activities and street performers

Parish of the Holy Child Church

The 1841 (19th century architecture) Santo Niño Parish Church, in under the jurisdiction of the Roman Catholic Archdiocese of Lingayen-Dagupan, Roman Catholic Diocese of Urdaneta. Its Feast Day is 3rd Sunday of January, with Parish Priest, Father Elisar Christopher M. Itchon and Parochial Vicar, Father Jun G. Laya and Vicar Forane, Father Elpidio F. Silva Jr.

Fr. Julian Izaga founded San Felipe, the origin of the Church and town freed from Manaoag since 1834, and moved to Santa Catalina, where he built church and a convent of light materials. Fr. Ramon Fernandez transferred the town in 1938 to the present site..

The Dominicans founded Binalonan Parish in 1841, under Kura Paroko, Fr. Domingo Llue and then, by Fr,. Policarpio Illana who began construction of the Church in 1842.

Fr. Antonio Vinelas erected in 1855 a bigger church, with Fr. Ruperto Alarcon's construction in 1861. Fr. Juan Fernandez (1861-1865) built a provisional church. In 1866–1873, Fr. Felix Cantador added old convent walls, while Fr. P.del Campo finished the Church. In 1879,

The October 19, 1881 typhoon destroyed the 1879 Church. Father Silvestre Fernandez added the 3 naves rehabilitation due to the earthquake of 1882. The Church was placed under the ecclesiastical jurisdiction of El Santisimo Nombre de Jesus. In the Hispano-American War the church was destroyed.

After the 1898 Revolution, Fr. Mariano Pacis became the Pastor of Manaoag and Binalonan, but it was Fr. Pio Mabutas who finished the Church in 1930. The Japanese destroyed the Church except the miraculous image of Santo Niño.

Fr. Pablo Evangelista rehabilitated the Church in 1946 and Fr. Leon Bitanga reconstructed in until 1961, founding the Holy Child Academy.

It was only on January 30, 2008, that the Church's marker was imposed upon generous donations of New York and New Jersey Binalonans (Joey and Remy Castelo-Sellona and Drs. Jose and Violy Quintos. (Source: Church marker, 2008).

Infrastructure

Healthcare

 Hospitals:
 Rural Health Unit/Centers: 8
 Barangay Health Stations: 24
 Malnutrition Rate: 9.06%
 Severely Underweight: 1.17%
 Moderately Underweight: 7.88%
 No. of Day Care Workers: 29
 No. of Day Care Centers: 29
 No. of Day Care Children: 544
 Contraceptive Prevalence Rate: 51%

Sanitation

Surveys show that 8,238 homes in Binalonan have water-sealed sewer/septic tank toilets which are used exclusively by members of the household.

Garbage is disposed of through burning.

Education

Other education centers include the WCC Aeronautical and Technological College (World Citi Colleges, (WCC) Aviation Company), an expansive facility which contains the Binalonan Airfield), St. Michael de Archangel College, Manantan Technical School, Holy Child Academy parochial school and Juan G. Macaraeg National High School.

WCC Aeronautical and Technological College, the aeronautical school that sits at the heart of Binalonan, Pangasinan. It also has the College of Engineering and Aviation Technology, College of Arts and Sciences, College of Tourism, and Flight Attendant Course. It offers the Flight Navigator Trainers Procedure II with MRO facilities, including its Airbus A320 full flight simulator.

Culture

Binalonan figures prominently in the novel America is in the Heart by Filipino-American writer Carlos Bulosan, who was born in Binalonan.  The first part of the semi-autobiographical novel features the struggles of Allos, the novel's main character, as he grows up as the son of a peasant farmer in Binalonan. The town has a memorial and street named after Bulosan just north of the municipal hall and town market.

Notable personalities

Notable people who either were born or resided in Binalonan include:
 Carlos Bulosan, Filipino-American writer best known for the novel America is in the Heart
 Evangelina de la Cruz Macaraeg Macapagal, spouse of 9th President Diosdado Macapagal, and mother of 14th President Gloria Macapagal Arroyo.

Gallery

References

External links

 
 Binalonan Profile at PhilAtlas.com
 Municipal Profile at the National Competitiveness Council of the Philippines
 Binalonan at the Pangasinan Government Website 
 Local Governance Performance Management System
 [ Philippine Standard Geographic Code]
 Philippine Census Information

Municipalities of Pangasinan